Their Eyes Were Watching God is a 2005 American television drama film based upon Zora Neale Hurston's 1937 novel of the same name. The film was directed by Darnell Martin, written by Suzan-Lori Parks, Misan Sagay, and Bobby Smith Jr., and produced by Oprah Winfrey's Harpo Productions (Winfrey served as the host for the broadcast). It stars Halle Berry, Ruben Santiago-Hudson, and Michael Ealy, and aired on ABC on March 6, 2005.

Cast
Halle Berry as Janie Crawford
Michael Ealy as Tea Cake
Ruben Santiago-Hudson as Joe Starks
Nicki Micheaux as Phoebe Watson
Lorraine Toussaint as Pearl Stone
Ruby Dee as Nanny Marnie
Terrence Howard as Amos Hicks
Gabriel Casseus as Sam Watson
Artel Kayàru as Motor Boat
Jensen Atwood as Johnny Taylor
Kevin Daniels as Liege Moss
Wayne Duvall as Dr. Gordon
Mel Winkler as Logan Killicks
Maura Gale as Lula Moss
Henry Brown as Water Stone

Reception
Catering to Winfrey's expected TV audience, the film largely avoided the more controversial themes of race, gender, and power that Hurston explored in her novel. Karen Valby of Entertainment Weekly comments, "While the book chews on meaty questions of race and identity, the movie largely resigns itself to the realm of sudsy romance." New York Times critic Virginia Heffernan said, "[T]he film is less a literary tribute than a visual fix of Harlequin Romance: Black Southern Series— all sensual soft-core scenes and contemporary, accessible language."

Sharon L. Jones, an English professor at Wright State University, agreed that the film was quite different from the novel. She said that the novel emphasizes Janie's life journey with others who are part of her establishing an identity, and she is sometimes overpowered by them. Jones says the film leaves out many important concepts that help convey the central theme. She says that Harpo's production was thought to address a more general idea of love to reach a broad range of audience, believed to be the majority-white females of Winfrey's TV audience.

Awards and nominations

References

Bibliography

External links
  Their Eyes Were Watching God at Oprah.com
 

2005 films
2005 drama films
2000s American films
2000s English-language films
Adaptations of works by Zora Neale Hurston
ABC network original films
American drama television films
Films based on American novels
Films directed by Darnell Martin
Films scored by Terence Blanchard
Films set in Florida
Films with screenplays by Suzan-Lori Parks
Harpo Productions films
Television films based on books
African-American films